Ben Casey is an American medical drama series which ran on ABC from 1961 to 1966. The show was known for its opening titles, which consisted of a hand drawing the symbols "♂, ♀, ✳, †, ∞" on a chalkboard, as cast member Sam Jaffe intoned, "Man, woman, birth, death, infinity.". The series starred Vincent Edwards, with co-star Sam Jaffe (seasons 1–4) and Franchot Tone (season 5). Harry Landers, Bettye Ackerman, Nick Dennis and Jeanne Bates were supporting regulars who appeared in a majority of episodes over the five seasons.

Series overview

Episodes

Season 1 (1961–62)

Season 2 (1962–63)

Season 3 (1963–64)

Season 4 (1964–65)

Season 5 (1965–66)

Home releases

The complete first season of Ben Casey is available on DVD in 2 volumes from CBS Home Entertainment. Volume 1 contains the first 16 episodes; the last 16 episodes are in Volume 2.

References

External links
 

Lists of American drama television series episodes